The U.S. Highways in Colorado are the segments of the national United States Numbered Highway System that are owned and maintained by the state of Colorado. The standards and numbering for the system are handled by the American Association of State Highway and Transportation Officials (AASHTO) while the routes in the state are maintained by the Colorado Department of Transportation (CDOT).

Mainline highways

Special routes

See also

References

External links
The Highways of Colorado by Matthew Salek

 
Lists of roads in Colorado